Solomone Piutau Ulamoleka Ata (16 May 1883 – 27 March 1950) was the Prime Minister of Tonga from 1941 until 1949.

Biography
Ata was the son of Tevita Manú'opangai Ata (1864–1898) and Pauline Manutu'ufanga Niumeitolu and was a cousin of HM Queen Sālote Tupou III. He attended Newington College, Sydney (1896–1902), with six other Tongan nobles. On returning to Tonga he worked in government and was appointed to the Ata title on 12 November 1904. He held various ministerial portfolios in cabinet and was Minister for Lands from 1925 until 1941. In 1937 he revisited Australia to study banana growing in sub-tropical areas. In 1941 he was appointed as Prime Minister of Tonga when his friend from his schooldays at Newington, Prince Viliami Tungī Mailefihi CBE, died. Ata thus became the second of four Old Newingtonian Tongan Prime ministers in a row as he was succeeded by Crown Prince Tāufaʻāhau Tungi KBE and then by Prince Fatafehi Tu'ipelehake CBE. Ata was made an honorary OBE in the New Years Honours List of 1947.

Honours 
  Honorary Officer of the Order of the British Empire (OBE)

References

 

1880s births
1950 deaths
People educated at Newington College
Prime Ministers of Tonga
Honorary Officers of the Order of the British Empire
People from Tongatapu